The 2017 NAIA Football National Championship was a four-round, sixteen team tournament played between November 18 and December 16 of 2017. The tournament will conclude on December 16 with a single game, played as the 62nd Annual NAIA Football National Championship . The game featured two undefeated teams that met in the semifinal round of the 2016 tournament, including the defending national champions, the #1-ranked Saint Francis Cougars.  Their opponent was the #2-ranked Reinhardt Eagles, in only the 5th year of the program's existence.  In the end, it was Saint Francis that prevailed by a final score of 24-13.  This was only the 5th time a team has managed back-to-back championships in the history of NAIA football.

The championship game was played at Municipal Stadium in Daytona Beach, Florida.  This was the 4th consecutive time the championship game was played at this venue after the prior six games were played at Barron Stadium in Rome, Georgia. A total of sixteen teams were selected to participate in the single-elimination tournament from across the country. The field included twelve conference champions who received automatic bids. The field was filled with at-large selections that were awarded to the highest ranked teams that were not conference champions. First-round seedings were based on the final edition of the 2017 NAIA Coaches' Poll, with certain minor modifications given based on geographic considerations.  Each subsequent round was re-seeded based on the rankings of all teams advancing to that round.

Quarterfinal pairings were announced by the NAIA on November 18, after the first round results were known.

Semifinal pairings were confirmed by the NAIA on November 25, soon after completion of the day's quarterfinal games.

Saint Francis senior quarterback Nick Ferrer was awarded the Rawlings Award for most valuable player in the NAIA prior to the championship.

Postseason

Playoff bracket

References

NAIA Football National Championship
Saint Francis Cougars football
Reinhardt Eagles football
Events in Daytona Beach, Florida
December 2017 sports events in the United States
2017 in sports in Florida